Chhatrapati Sambhajinagar Central Assembly constituency is one of the six constituencies of Maharashtra Vidhan Sabha located in Chhatrapati Sambhajinagar district.

It is a part of the Chhatrapati Sambhajinagar (Lok Sabha constituency) along with five other assembly constituencies, viz Vaijapur, Gangapur, Chhatrapati Sambhajinagar East, Kannad and Chhatrapati Sambhajinagar West (SC)

Members of Legislative Assembly

Election results

Assembly Elections 2019

Assembly Elections 2014

Assembly Elections 2009

1.ward’s Distribution map   

https://in.docworkspace.com/d/sIE7Jq6we67fpmwY?sa=e1&st=0t

Aurangabad district, Maharashtra
Year of establishment missing
Assembly constituencies of Maharashtra